Elgonina inexpextata is a species of tephritid or fruit flies in the genus Elgonina of the family Tephritidae.

Distribution
The Elgonina inexpextata is found in Kenya, Africa.

References

Tephritinae
Insects described in 2006
Diptera of Africa